Kuseh (also Romanized as Kūseh; also known as Kūseh Takht) is a village in Jirestan Rural District, Sarhad District, Shirvan County, North Khorasan Province, Iran. At the 2006 census, its population was 645, in 159 families.

The local language is Turkmen.

References 

Populated places in Shirvan County